The Old Man and the Sea is a 1958 American adventure drama film directed by John Sturges and starring Spencer Tracy. The screenplay by Peter Viertel was based on the 1952 novel of the same name by Ernest Hemingway.

Dimitri Tiomkin won the Academy Award for Best Original Score for his work on the film. The film was also nominated for Best Color Cinematography (Howe) and Best Actor (Tracy).

Plot
The Old Man in the film is a Cuban fisherman who has gone 84 days without a catch. His only friend is a 14-year-old boy named Manolin, who has been barred by his father from accompanying the Old Man out to sea. On the Old Man's 85th day out, he finally hooks a huge marlin, which he then tries to haul in from far out past shore. For three days and nights he battles the fish, which is portrayed in the film (as it had been in Hemingway's novella) as a trial of mental and physical courage that becomes the ultimate test for him of his worth as a man.

Cast
 Spencer Tracy as The Old Man
 Felipe Pazos Jr. as Manolin
 Harry Bellaver as Martin
 Don Diamond as Café proprietor
 Don Blackman as Arm wrestler
 Joey Ray as a gambler
 Richard Alameda as a gambler
 Tony Rosa as a gambler
 Carlos Rivero as a gambler
 Robert Alderette as a gambler
 Don Alvarado (uncredited) as a waiter

Production
The director originally assigned to the film was Fred Zinnemann, but he withdrew, and was replaced by John Sturges. The film's budget, originally $2 million, grew to $5 million "in search of suitable fish footage." Sturges called it "technically the sloppiest picture I have ever made."

According to Turner Classic Movies, a February 2005 CNN article points out that The Old Man and the Sea was one of the first films to "use a bluescreen compositing technology invented by Arthur Widmer, that combined actors on a soundstage with a pre-filmed background."

The credits note that "Some of the marlin film used in this picture was of the world's record catch by Alfred C. Glassell Jr. at the Cabo Blanco Fishing Club in Peru. Mr. Glassell acted as special advisor for these sequences."

Music

Veteran film composer Dimitri Tiomkin composed and conducted the music for the film. His soundtrack recording, with the Warner Brothers Studio Orchestra, was recorded in the auditorium of Hollywood Post No. 43, American Legion, in Hollywood; Billboard reported that the acoustics in the Hollywood Legion were "far superior to most studio space in Hollywood and similar to that of the best concert halls." During the week of April 21, 1958, Columbia held open sessions for The Old Man and the Sea at the Legion Hall. The soundtrack was later released in both stereo and mono by Columbia Records.

Reception
Bosley Crowther of The New York Times wrote:
Credit Leland Hayward for trying something off the beaten track in making a motion-picture version of Ernest Hemingway's The Old Man and the Sea, and credit Spencer Tracy for a brave performance in its one big role. Also credit Dimitri Tiomkin for providing a musical score that virtually puts Mr. Tracy in the position of a soloist with a symphony. And that just about completes a run-down of the praiseworthy aspects of this film.
Among the film's shortcomings, Crowther notes, is that "an essential feeling of the sweep and surge of the open sea is not achieved in precise and placid pictures that obviously were shot in a studio tank. There are, to be sure, some lovely long shots of Cuban villages and the colorful coast...But the main drama, that of the ordeal, is played in a studio tank, and even some fine shots of a marlin breaking the surface and shaking in violent battle are deflated by obvious showing on the process screen."

The film has been described as the "most literal, word-for-word rendition of a written story ever filmed". Time noted that "the script follows the book in almost every detail", but called the novel a fable "no more suitable for the screen than The Love Song of J. Alfred Prufrock". Time pointed out that Tracy was "never permitted to catch a marlin" while on location, so the "camera could never catch him at it" and the result is "Sturges must cross-cut so interminably—fish, Tracy, fish, Tracy—that Old Man loses the lifelikeness, the excitement, and above all the generosity of rhythm that the theme requires.

According to producer Hayward, Hemingway was pleased with the film, and said it had "a wonderful emotional quality and [he] is very grateful and pleased with the transference of his material to the screen. He thought Tracy was great (in light of his quarrels with him this is quite a compliment) ... the photography was excellent ... the handling of the fishing and mechanical fish very good. Had some minor dislikes ... but all in all he was terribly high on the picture and pleased with it." Hemingway was notorious for his dislike for most of the film adaptations of his stories, and in 1959, he implicitly disagreed with Hayward's assessment, stating that the only Hollywood adaptation of one of his stories that he liked was The Killers.

See also
 List of American films of 1958

Notes

References

External links
 
 
 
 
 

1958 films
1950s adventure drama films
American adventure drama films
Films scored by Dimitri Tiomkin
Films about fishing
Films about old age
Films based on works by Ernest Hemingway
Films directed by John Sturges
Films directed by Fred Zinnemann 
Films set in Cuba
Films set in the Caribbean
Films shot in Cuba
Films shot in Ecuador
Films shot in Peru
Films that won the Best Original Score Academy Award
Sea adventure films
Warner Bros. films
Films set on boats
American survival films
1958 drama films
1950s English-language films
1950s American films